Warbah Island is an island belonging to Kuwait, located in the Persian Gulf, near the mouth of the Euphrates River.

The island has no permanent inhabitants although the government maintains a coastguard post, named M-1 on the island which is partially funded by the United Nations.

In November 1994, Iraq formally accepted the UN-demarcated border with Kuwait which had been spelled out in Security Council Resolutions 687 (1991), 773 (1993), and 833 (1993) which formally ended an earlier claim to Warbah Island.

Near the island in early December 2002, in the lead-up to the invasion of Iraq, an Iraqi ship opened fire on two Kuwaiti coastguard patrol boats, causing them to collide. A US serviceman and two Kuwaiti coastguards were injured in the attack, no mention was made of the reason for the US serviceman's presence.

References

Uninhabited islands of Kuwait
Disputed territories in the Persian Gulf
Territorial disputes of Iraq
Territorial disputes of Kuwait
Iraq–Kuwait border